Fairmount Avenue may refer to:

 Fairmount Avenue (Baltimore County), a road in Baltimore County, Maryland
 Fairmount Avenue Line, MTA Maryland bus route #23
 Fairmount Avenue (NJT station), former New Jersey Transit Rail station
 Fairmount Avenue (MBTA station), MBTA rail station in Massachusetts
 Fairmount Avenue Historic District, in Philadelphia, Pennsylvania
 26 Fairmount Avenue, children's novel by Tomie de Paola
 Fairmount Avenue (Montreal), site of several famous Montreal landmarks, such as Fairmount Bagel
 Fairmount Avenue, the defining street of Fairmount, Richmond, Virginia
 Fairmount Avenue, the defining street of Fairmount, Philadelphia, Pennsylvania

See also
 Fairmount Historic District (disambiguation)
 Fairmount (disambiguation)